The ESP Couple is a 2008 South Korean supernatural romance film starring Jin Goo and Park Bo-young. The film marks editor Kim Hyung-joo's debut as a director.

Synopsis
Su-min (Jin Goo) a college student who keeps his psychic powers a secret, living a quiet, lonely life. One day at an art gallery he is accosted by a strange girl called Hyun-jin (Park Bo-young) who insists on following him around. After an incident in the park involving an undercover police attempt to arrest a kidnapper gives her a display of his abilities, she attaches herself to him, determined to find out exactly what he is capable of. His feelings for her gradually change from annoyance to romantic yearning, though she herself appears to be hiding a secret of her own.

Cast
 Jin Goo as Su-min
 Ham Sung-min as young Su-min
 Park Bo-young as Hyun-jin
 Jo Yeon-ho
 Lee Sang-hong
 Min Ji-min
 Han Gap-soo

References

External links
 
 
 
 

2008 films
2000s Korean-language films
South Korean romantic comedy films
South Korean mystery films
2000s supernatural films
2008 romantic comedy films
Supernatural romantic films
2000s South Korean films